Alessandro Cesca (born 1 December 1980) is an Italian professional football player who currently plays for A.C.D. Treviso.

Cesca joined Carpi F.C. 1909 in January 2011. In July 2011 he signed a new 4-year contract with Carpi (along with Giacomo Cenetti), Cesca was transferred to A.C. Pavia in January 2012. In mid-2013 he was signed by Bellaria. On 9 January 2014 he was signed by Rimini.

References

External links
 AIC profile (data by football.it) 
 

1980 births
Living people
Italian footballers
A.S.D. Victor San Marino players
Bassano Virtus 55 S.T. players
Nuorese Calcio players
A.C. Bellaria Igea Marina players
Rimini F.C. 1912 players
People from the Province of Udine
Footballers from Friuli Venezia Giulia
Association football forwards
Cosenza Calcio players